The River & the Thread is the thirteenth studio album by American singer-songwriter Rosanne Cash. It was released on January 14, 2014, as her first album for Blue Note Records. The album received critical acclaim from music critics. The album won three Grammy Awards on February 8, 2015, such as "Best Americana Album", "Best American Roots Song" and "Best American Roots Performance".

Critical reception

The River & the Thread garnered critical acclaim by music critics. At Metacritic, which assigns a mean score from selected critics' ratings and reviews, the album holds a score of 87 (based on 19 reviews), which indicates "universal acclaim." At Los Angeles Times, Randy Lewis rated the album a perfect four stars, proclaiming that "It's an album we'll be looking at in December when it's time to single out the most powerful works of 2014. Holly Gleason of Paste rated the album an eight point eight, noting that "With 
The River & The Thread, she comes home with the warmth reserved for knowing where we're from." At The New Zealand Herald, Graham Reid rated the album four-and-a-half stars, saying that on this album "Cash proves again she does the darkly philosophical, ruminative stuff better and more convincingly than most." Jerry Shriver of USA Today rated the album a perfect four stars, calling it "a captivating and sometimes haunting album that's among the finest of her career." At Record Collector, Terry Stauton rated the album a perfect five stars, exclaiming that "It's a record that her late father would have been enormously proud of, and the first essential country album of 2014."

At Country Weekly, Tammy Ragusa graded the album a B+, indicating this album "will require multiple listens to truly appreciate, so set aside some time to soak in this one." Tony Hardy of Consequence of Sound graded the album a B, writing that the album is "a consummate piece of work, and an evocative way to honor both personal and public history." At Allmusic, stating that the artist "learned to make every word and every note count, and this album confirms once again that she's matured into a singular artist with the talent and the vision to make these stories of her travels in the South come to vivid and affecting life." Jim Farber of the New York Daily News rated the album four stars, affirming that "As always, Cash's vocals aren’t brimming with character, but their tidiness suits her observational lyrics and considered personality. Together, they lead her home by a route laid out clearly enough to show just how far she strayed." At Blurt, Lee Zimmerman rated the album four stars, alluding to how the album "manages to surge and sway all at the same time", and noting that "Indeed, it doesn't get much better than this."

Track list

Personnel
Adapted from Rosanne Cash's official website.
Tawatha Agee - background vocals
Rosanne Cash - lead vocals, background vocals
Cory Chisel - harmony vocals
Reuben Cohen - mastering 
Donivan Cowart - recording
Jon Cowherd - wurlitzer piano
Rodney Crowell - choir (track 10)
Jill Dell’Abate - production co-ordination 
Rick DePofi - background vocals, percussion, mixing
Dave Eggar - cello
Tabitha Fair - background vocals
Larry Farrell - trombone
Amy Helm - background vocals, choir (track 10)
John James - background vocals
Curtis King - background vocals
Kris Kristofferson - choir (track 10)
Jake Leventhal - background vocals, percussion
John Leventhal - producer, mixing, guitar, harmony vocals, bass guitar, drums, percussion, organ, celeste, mandolin, electric sitar, string arrangement
Tim Luntzel - bass guitar, upright bass
Gavin Lurssen - mastering
David Mansfield - violin, viola
Allison Moorer - harmony vocals (track 11)
Shawn Pelton - drums
John Prine - choir (track 10)
Dan Rieser - drums
Catherine Russell - background vocals
Bobby Tis - recording
Derek Trucks - slide guitar
John Paul White - harmony vocals (track 3)
Tony Joe White - choir (track 10)
Gabe Witcher - fiddle

Chart performance
The album debuted on the Billboard 200 at No. 11 with 19,000 copies sold for the week.  The album has sold 94,000 copies in the US as of February 2015.

Weekly charts

Year-end charts

References

2014 albums
Rosanne Cash albums
Blue Note Records albums
Albums produced by John Leventhal
Grammy Award for Best Americana Album